Ban Lueam is a district (amphoe) in the northern part of Nakhon Ratchasima province, northeastern Thailand.

Etymology
The name Lueam comes from the Ma Lueam tree (Canarium subulatum Guill.). In the past, a big tree of this kind was the landmark of the village.

History
Tambon Ban Lueam, Wang Pho, and Khok Krabueang were separated from Khong district to create a minor district (king amphoe) on 18 October 1976. It was upgraded to a full district on 1 January 1988.

Geography
Neighbouring districts are (from the north clockwise): Kaeng Sanam Nang, Bua Yai, and Khong of Nakhon Ratchasima province, and Noen Sa-nga and Mueang Chaiyaphum of Chaiyaphum province.

Administration
The district is divided into four sub-districts (tambons), which are further subdivided into 39 villages (mubans). Ban Lueam is also a sub-district municipality (thesaban tambon) covering parts of tambons Ban Lueam and Wang Pho. There are a further four tambon administrative organizations (TAO).

References

External links
amphoe.com

Ban Lueam